John Harding (23 June 1933 – 2 July 2020) was an Irish hurler. At club level he played with the Shelmaliers club and was an All-Ireland Championship winner with the Wexford senior hurling team in 1960.

Playing career

Born in Curracloe, Harding first played hurling with his local Shelmaliers club, winning a county junior championship medal in 1954. After lining out at midfield for the Wexford junior team, he was drafted onto the senior team as full-forward for the 1960 Leinster Championship. Harding claimed a Leinster Championship medal that season before later winning an All-Ireland Championship medal after Wexford's shock win over Tipperary in the final. After a short-lived inter-county career, Harding continued to line out with Shelmaliers, with whom he won a second junior county championship title in 1966.

Death

Harding died at his home in Curracloe on 2 July 2020. His wife predeceased him in 2005 and he was survived by his eight children.

Honours

Shelmaliers
Wexford Junior Hurling Championship (2): 1954, 1966

Wexford
All-Ireland Senior Hurling Championship (1): 1960
Leinster Senior Hurling Championship (1): 1960

References

1933 births
2020 deaths
Shelmaliers hurlers
Wexford inter-county hurlers
All-Ireland Senior Hurling Championship winners